Hugo Diego Arismendi Ciapparetta (born 25 January 1988) is a Uruguayan footballer who plays as a midfielder for Montevideo City Torque.

Arismendi began his career with Nacional, one of Uruguay's leading clubs. His performances for Nacional in the Copa Libertadores earned him a call up to the Uruguay national team and to the attention of clubs in Europe. English Premier League side Stoke City signed Arismendi a fee of £2.6 million becoming the club's first South American player. However at Stoke he failed to make any impact and was only included in cup and European matches. He also spent time out on loan at Brighton & Hove Albion, Barnsley and Huddersfield Town. After ending his unsuccessful time in England he returned to Uruguay.

Career
On 29 August 2009 it was reported that Arismendi had agreed personal terms and passed a medical with Stoke City.
It was then announced late on 31 August 2009 that he had signed for a fee of £2.6 million possibly rising to £4.8 million. 
 Arismendi made his Stoke debut in a 4–3 win over Blackpool in the League Cup on 22 September 2009. He was substituted at half-time due to an injury.

On 2 March 2010 Arismendi joined League One side Brighton & Hove Albion on loan linking up with fellow country man Gus Poyet. His time on the south coast was overshadowed by injury as he endured a miserable time which ended with a red card against MK Dons in his final game for the club. On 12 July 2010 Arismendi joined championship side Barnsley on a season long loan. He scored his first goal in English football against Leeds United in a 5–2 win for Barnsley. He returned to Stoke at the start of the 2011–12 season and whilst he has made the matchday squad a few occasions he has remained as an used substitute. He did make four appearances in the away matches in the UEFA Europa League including their final match against Valencia.

He joined Huddersfield Town on loan on 16 March 2012 until the end of the season. He made his debut for the "Terriers" the following day as a substitute in their 1–1 draw at Colchester United at the Colchester Community Stadium. His first start for the club came in the 1–0 home victory over league leaders Charlton Athletic on 24 March 2012.

Arismendi was left out of Stoke's 25-man squad for the 2012–13 season leaving his future certain to be away from the Britannia Stadium. His contract at Stoke was terminated at the end of November 2012 bringing an end to a poor three years at the club in which he managed just six appearances none of which came in a Premier League match. He returned to Uruguay and re-signed for Nacional.

International career
He received his first international cap in a friendly match against Norway on 28 May 2008 followed up by his second in a World Cup qualifier against Bolivia both games finished 2–2.

Personal life
Whilst living in England, Arismendi was branded a 'sex pest' after forcing his neighbour to move due to hosting late night parties.

Career statistics

Club

International
Source:

References

External links

 

1988 births
Living people
Footballers from Montevideo
Uruguayan footballers
Uruguay under-20 international footballers
Uruguay international footballers
Uruguayan expatriate footballers
Association football defenders
Club Nacional de Football players
Stoke City F.C. players
Brighton & Hove Albion F.C. players
Barnsley F.C. players
Huddersfield Town A.F.C. players
Uruguayan Primera División players
English Football League players
Expatriate footballers in England
Al-Shabab FC (Riyadh) players
Expatriate footballers in Saudi Arabia
Saudi Professional League players
Rosario Central footballers
Racing Club de Montevideo players
Expatriate footballers in Argentina
Argentine Primera División players